Choi Won-joon (born December 21, 1994) is a South Korean professional baseball pitcher currently playing for the Doosan Bears of the KBO League. He competed in the 2020 Summer Olympics.

References

External links
 Career statistics and player information from the KBO League

 Choi Won-joon at Doosan Bears Baseball Club

1994 births
Living people
Baseball players from Seoul
Doosan Bears players
KBO League pitchers
South Korean baseball players
Olympic baseball players of South Korea
Baseball players at the 2020 Summer Olympics